The Fekola Hybrid Power Station, is a  power plant in Mali. The power system comprises 68 MW of thermal energy, 30 MW of solar power and 17.3 MW of lithium ion battery energy storage. The power station is owned by B2Gold Corporation, a Canadian mining company. Dornier Suntrace GmbH (also Suntrace) and BayWa, two German engineering consulting and construction companies were hired to advise, design, build, operate and maintain this power station. The off-taker is the Fekola Gold Mine, in southwestern Mali, that is off-grid and is owned by B2Gold.

Location
The power station is located in the settlement of Fadougou, in Kenieba Cercle, in the Kayes Region in southwestern Mali, near the border with Senegal.

Overview
Before 2019, the Fekola gold mine had a legacy thermal power station with capacity of 68 megawatts. The thermal station has six units, with each unit capable of generating 11.33 MW at maximum output. These units use heavy fuel oil. On the advice of Dornier Suntrace GmbH and BayWa, B2Gold Corporation, who own the power station added a 30 MW solar power unit and a 17.3MW/15.4 MWh battery storage system to modulate power availability between the thermal units and the solar farm. The mine requires electricity supply 24/7.

The battery energy storage system was supplied by Wärtsilä of Finland. The software selected is the Greensmith Energy Management System (GEMS), also supplied by Wärtsilä. It integrates and modulates energy supply between the three types of energy sources; thermal, solar and battery storage.

Benefits
The addition of the solar farm and the battery storage system allows the power station to rest three of the six thermal generators during the day. This allows the electricity demand of the gold mine during daytime to be covered up to 75 percent by renewable energy. The mine is able to avoid the burning of over 13,000,000 liters of heavy fuel oil annually. This lowers the carbon dioxide footprint of this mine by 39,000 tonnes every year.

See also

 List of power stations in Mali
 Syama Hybrid Power Station

References

External links
 Profile of Fekola Gold Mine In Mali. As of May 2022.

Power stations in Mali
Energy infrastructure in Mali
Buildings and structures in Mali
2021 establishments in Mali
Kayes Region
Energy infrastructure completed in 2021